Claude Dambreville (born 1934) is a Haitian writer and painter. He was born in Port-au-Prince, Haiti, December 17, 1934. After attending art school in Haiti, he became a painter. Dambreville continued to write and in 1983, he won the annual literary Henri Deschamps award for his novel, Un gout de Fiel.

Biography 
Claude Dambreville grew up in Port-au-Prince, Haiti's capital. From a very young age he began writing and drawing. His first job was running a local radio station, and in his spare time he would submit humorous articles and hand-drawn comics to a weekly Haitian newspaper. In 1968, he enrolled at the Centre d'Arte in Port-au-Prince and began taking art classes. Around the same time, he took correspondence courses from the ABC school of Paris, and then enrolled at L'Atelier, a Haitian school owned by the artist Nehemy Jean. During his time in school he began successfully working full time as an artist. While studying at L'Atelier in 1973, he met and married the daughter of one of his teachers, Bettyna Savain. In 1981, he received a grant from the United States to tour art schools and museums giving lectures on his work and Haitian art. He and his wife moved to the Dominican Republic and lived in Puerto Plata from 1999 to 2011. They then moved to Miami, Florida with their two children, Vadim and Tao-Claude.

Novels 
In 1983 he wrote his most important novel, Un gout de Fiel, and in 1995 he co-wrote the book, L'Amerique Saigne, with Franck Etienne, which became a national best seller in Haiti.

Painting 
Claude Dambreville is best known for his paintings of Haitian women at market. His style combines bold, minimalistic 2D color blocking, with soft, brushy modeling along with a strong use of light and shadow. His more contemporary works have focused on portrait style painting of women, children and musicians. When asked how he chooses his subject matter he said, "I take my inspiration from the popular and rustic life of Haiti. In my opinion, it's the only way to identify myself as a Haitian Painter."

Principal collections 
 Centre d'Art, Port-au-Prince, Haiti
 The Museum of College St. Pierre, Port-au-Prince, Haiti
 Nader Art Gallery, Miami, Florida
 Jolicoeur Gallery, Havelock, Ontario
 Issa Gallery, Port-au-Prince, Haiti
 Medalia Gallery, New York City, New York 
 Waterloo Center for the Arts, Waterloo, Iowa

References

External links 
 Waterloo Center for the Arts

1934 births
Haitian writers
Living people
Haitian painters
Haitian male painters